Cliff Mountain is a mountain located in Essex County, New York. 
The mountain is part of the Marcy Group of the Great Range of the Adirondack Mountains.
Cliff is flanked to the southeast by Mount Redfield.

Cliff Mountain stands within the watershed of the Opalescent River, a tributary of the Hudson River, which in turn drains into New York Bay.
The north and west sides of Cliff Mtn. drain directly into the Opalescent River.
The southeast side drains into Upper Twin Brook, thence into the Opalescent River.

The mountain is within the High Peaks Wilderness Area of Adirondack State Park. No marked trail leads to its summit.

See also 
 List of mountains in New York
 Northeast 111 4,000-footers 
 Adirondack High Peaks
 Adirondack Forty-Sixers

References

External links 
 

Mountains of Essex County, New York
Adirondack High Peaks
Mountains of New York (state)